Havant is a constituency in Hampshire represented in the House of Commons of the UK Parliament since 2015 by Alan Mak, a member of the Conservative Party. He is the first person of Chinese and East Asian origin to be elected to the House of Commons.

Constituency profile
The constituency comprises most of the borough (and the town) of Havant in Hampshire. This includes Hayling Island, Waterlooville and Emsworth.

Residents are slightly poorer and less likely to be university-educated than the UK average.

Boundaries

1983–1997: The Borough of Havant wards of Barncroft, Battins, Bedhampton, Bondfields, Cowplain, Emsworth, Hart Plain, Hayling East, Hayling West, St Faith's, Warren Park, and Waterloo.

1997–present: The Borough of Havant wards of Barncroft, Battins, Bedhampton, Bondfields, Emsworth, Hayling East, Hayling West, Purbrook, St Faith's, Stakes, and Warren Park.

History
The constituency was preceded by Havant and Waterloo.

The current MP Alan Mak is the first person of Chinese and East Asian origin to be elected to the House of Commons of the United Kingdom.

Members of Parliament

Elections

Elections in the 2010s

Elections in the 2000s

Elections in the 1990s

Elections in the 1980s

See also
List of parliamentary constituencies in Hampshire

Notes

References

Sources
Election result, 2005 (BBC)
Election results, 1997 - 2001 (BBC)
Election results, 1997 - 2001  (Election Demon)
Election results, 1983 - 1992  (Election Demon)
Election results, 1992 - 2005  (Guardian)

Parliamentary constituencies in Hampshire
Constituencies of the Parliament of the United Kingdom established in 1983
Borough of Havant
Havant